Pinhook is an inactive village in Mississippi County, Missouri, United States. The population was 6 at the 2020 census.

It was settled in the 1920s by sharecroppers. The community takes its name from a nearby ridge of the same name which in turn was so named on account it having the form of a pinhook. The community was flooded in May 2011 when the U.S. Army Corps of Engineers breached the Bird’s Point Levee to save the town of Cairo, Illinois. The government did not assist or provide help to evacuate Pinhook.  The residents were left entirely on their own before the levee breach.  Afterwards, the former residents resettled in East Prairie and Sikeston.

Geography
Pinhook is located at  (36.739225, -89.267693).

Demographics

2020 census

Note: the US Census treats Hispanic/Latino as an ethnic category. This table excludes Latinos from the racial categories and assigns them to a separate category. Hispanics/Latinos can be of any race.

2010 census
As of the census of 2010, there were 30 people, 17 households, and 8 families residing in the village. The racial makeup of the village was 3.33% White and 96.67% Black or African American.

There were 17 households, of which 11.8% had children under the age of 18 living with them, 29.4% were married couples living together, 11.8% had a female householder with no husband present, 5.9% had a male householder with no wife present, and 52.9% were non-families. 52.9% of all households were made up of individuals, and 17.6% had someone living alone who was 65 years of age or older. The average household size was 1.76 and the average family size was 2.63.

The median age in the village was 54 years. 10% of residents were under the age of 18; 6.7% were between the ages of 18 and 24; 10% were from 25 to 44; 39.9% were from 45 to 64; and 33.3% were 65 years of age or older. The gender makeup of the village was 50.0% male and 50.0% female.

2000 census
As of the census of 2000, there were 48 people, 20 households, and 15 families residing in the village. The population density was 336.1 people per square mile (132.4/km). There were 21 housing units at an average density of 147.0 per square mile (57.9/km). The racial makeup of the village was 10.42% White, 87.50% African American, and 2.08% from two or more races.

There were 20 households, out of which 35.0% had children under the age of 18 living with them, 40.0% were married couples living together, 35.0% had a female householder with no husband present, and 25.0% were non-families. 25.0% of all households were made up of individuals, and 10.0% had someone living alone who was 65 years of age or older. The average household size was 2.40 and the average family size was 2.87.

In the village, the population was spread out, with 29.2% under the age of 18, 6.3% from 18 to 24, 29.2% from 25 to 44, 18.8% from 45 to 64, and 16.7% who were 65 years of age or older. The median age was 38 years. For every 100 females, there were 71.4 males. For every 100 females age 18 and over, there were 70.0 males.

The median income for a household in the village was $15,417, and the median income for a family was $16,250. Males had a median income of $23,750 versus $16,250 for females. The per capita income for the village was $10,114. There were 47.1% of families and 55.4% of the population living below the poverty line, including 50.0% of under eighteens and 83.3% of those over 64.

History
Mystery surrounds the founding of Pinhook.  Many people believe that it was founded by sharecroppers in the 1930s. This largely African American colony expanded to nearly 250 people at its peak. During the summer of 2011 the Mississippi began to flood.  Pinhook was destroyed on May 2, 2011 when the Birds Point-New Madrid levee was blown to save Cairo, Illinois from flooding. Everyone in Pinhook lost the homes that they had lived in for many years. Many were devastated because they loved living in a small community, knowing everyone. These people fled to family or apartments, until they could find a new home. There has been talk of relocating the community, but the funding is unavailable. In August 2015 the remaining buildings were bulldozed.

References

Villages in Mississippi County, Missouri
Villages in Missouri
Populated places disestablished in 2013
Populated places established by African Americans